The European Stability Initiative (ESI) is a think tank focusing on South East Europe and enlargement of the European Union. It has offices in Berlin, Brussels and Istanbul.

History
The ESI was founded in June 1999 in Sarajevo. Its founders, multi-national practitioners and analysts, were members of international organisations like the OSCE, the United Nations or the World Bank. It was founded as a research network to advance the integration of the Balkans into the European Union following the end of the Kosovo War. ESI's founding chairman is Gerald Knaus. In 2000, ESI opened its first offices, in Berlin and Brussels. In 2004, ESI opened an office in Istanbul and launched its first initiatives on Turkey's social and economic developments in the context of EU accession.

In June 2007, ESI began to work on a documentary series called “Balkan Express/Return to Europe”. The films cover the stories of people fighting for democratic values in ten countries (Albania, Kosovo, Montenegro, Bosnia-Herzegovina, Macedonia, Serbia, Romania, Bulgaria, Greece, and Turkey).
From April 2008 onwards, the films were broadcast, first on the German language channels 3sat and ORF and then on television worldwide. 
In late 2008, Return to Europe was awarded the "Erasmus Euro Media Grand Award" for outstanding European media production by the European Society for Education and Communication (ESEC). ESEC Chairman Thomas A. Bauer noted that the series "combined inspired directing with sound scientific research".

Between 2012 and 2016, ESI focused its research on the human rights situation in Azerbaijan, EU enlargement methodology, the EU-Turkey visa liberalisation process, the EU approach to economic issues in the Western Balkan countries and the Syrian refugee crisis.

Work
ESI is a non-profit organisation and is financed by donations. As of 2013, its projects on EU enlargement, capacity building, and human rights were funded by the Swedish International Development Cooperation Agency, Stiftung Mercator, the Open Society Foundations, and ERSTE Stiftung. In 2006, the ESI had a monthly budget of 45,000 euro. 
In 2013, the ESI had produced more than 62 reports.
 
Today it counts with 100 background analyses and policy recommendations.

References

External links
 
 Think Tank Directory Germany
 Return to Europe website

Political and economic think tanks based in Germany
1999 establishments in Bosnia and Herzegovina
Think tanks established in 1999
Non-profit organisations based in Berlin
Organizations based in Sarajevo
European integration think tanks